Pollex crispus is a moth of the family Erebidae first described by Michael Fibiger in 2007. It is known from northern Sulawesi in Indonesia.

The wingspan is about 13 mm. The forewing is narrow and dark brown, although the terminal area is blackish brown. The hindwing is unicolorous brown with an indistinct black discal spot and the underside unicolorous brown.

References

Micronoctuini
Moths described in 2007